Muhammad Naji al-Otari (also Etri, Itri and Otri) (born 1944) is a Syrian politician who was Prime Minister of Syria from 2003 to 2011.

Early life and education
Born in Aleppo in 1944, Otari studied architecture and has a diploma in urban planning from the Netherlands. He is fluent in French and English.

Career
Otari headed the city council in Aleppo from 1983 to 1987 and is a former governor of Homs. He was president of Aleppo's engineering syndicate from 1989 to 1993. He is a long-serving member of the ruling Arab Socialist Ba'ath Party. In March 2000, he became a member of the Ba'ath Party's Central Committee and in June 2000 of the party's influential Regional Command. In March 2000, he was also appointed deputy prime minister for services affairs and he served in this post until 2003. He was elected speaker of the Syrian parliament, or People's Assembly, in March 2003.

Prime Minister
He was first appointed Prime Minister on 10 September 2003. His nomination has been said to combine both "technocratic and Ba'athist trends" in Syrian politics. On 29 March 2011, the entire cabinet resigned out of protest against the regime. On 3 April 2011, President Assad appointed Adel Safar to succeed Otari.

References

|-

1944 births
Living people
Members of the Regional Command of the Arab Socialist Ba'ath Party – Syria Region
People from Aleppo
Prime Ministers of Syria
Speakers of the People's Assembly of Syria
Syrian Muslims